Sanath Jayasuriya is a Sri Lankan cricketer and former captain of the Sri Lanka national cricket team. He is an all-rounder and opening batsman, and is known for his aggressive batting style that has earned him the name "Master Blaster". His batting style introduced a new strategy to the game during the 1996 World Cup, where he and fellow opener Romesh Kaluwitharana batted highly aggressively in the early overs using fielding restrictions to their advantage. This later became a standard opening batting strategy and, according to Australian cricketer Glenn McGrath, Jayasuriya "changed everyone's thinking about how to start innings". As a result of his performances, Jayasuriya was selected as a Wisden Cricketer of the Year in 1997, despite not having played in the previous English cricketing season. He scored 42 centuries in Test and One Day International (ODI) games, but was not able to score a century in a Twenty20 International match, where his highest score is 88.

Although Jayasuriya made his Test debut in 1991, it was not until 1996 that he scored his first century, when he had become a regular player in the Sri Lankan side. His career high of 340 against India in August 1997 was the highest score by a Sri Lankan cricketer until 2006 and is also part of the highest team total (952/6) made in Test cricket. He has also scored two double centuries; 213 against England and 253 against Pakistan. His 157 against Zimbabwe in 2004 is the second fastest century by a Sri Lankan player. Jayasuriya, having scored centuries against every Test playing nation except New Zealand and the West Indies, retired from Test cricket in 2007 with 14 to his name.

Jayasuriya made his ODI debut in 1989 and started playing as an opening batsman in 1993. He went on to score his first century in 1994 against New Zealand. From then on, Jayasuriya has scored the highest number of ODI centuries for Sri Lanka with 28 to his name. , he holds fourth place for the most ODI centuries in a career, behind Sachin Tendulkar (49 centuries), Virat Kohli (43 centuries) and Ricky Ponting (30 centuries). His second century, 134 against Pakistan in 1996, was scored at a strike rate of 206.15 and was the fastest century in ODI cricket at the time. This record was later broken by Pakistani cricketer Shahid Afridi. The 189 he made against India in 2000 is the sixth highest ODI score in a single innings. Making his second highest ODI score of 157 against the Netherlands in 2006, Jayasuriya paved the way for Sri Lanka to set the world record for the highest ODI team total of 443/9. With his 107 against India on 28 January 2009, Jayasuriya—39 years and 212 days old at the time—became the oldest player to score a century, and also became the second player to score more than 13,000 runs in a career.

Key 
 *  Remained not out
   Captain in that match
   Man of the match 
 (D/L)  Result was determined by the Duckworth–Lewis method

Test centuries

ODI centuries

Notes

References

External links
Player profile of Jayasuriya at Cricinfo

Jayasuriya
Jayasuriya, Sanath